The 75th Tony Awards  were held on June 12, 2022, to recognize achievement in Broadway productions during the 2021–22 season. The ceremony was held at Radio City Music Hall in New York City, with Ariana DeBose serving as host of the main ceremony, and Darren Criss and Julianne Hough co-hosting a streaming pre-show.

The most-awarded productions of the season were the new play The Lehman Trilogy, which won five awards, including Best Play, and the revival of Stephen Sondheim’s musical Company, which also won five awards, including Best Revival of a Musical. The Pulitzer Prize-winning musical A Strange Loop was the most-nominated show of the season, with 11 nominations, and won Best Musical, becoming the first Best Musical winner to win only two awards total since 42nd Street (1981).

With her nomination for Best Featured Actress in a Musical in A Strange Loop, L Morgan Lee became the first openly transgender person to be nominated for a Tony. Additionally, with her win as a lead producer of A Strange Loop, Jennifer Hudson became the 17th person to win Emmy, Grammy, Academy, and Tony awards in their entertainment career.

Ceremony information

Returning to its usual June scheduling, the ceremony's telecast was split between Paramount+ and CBS. Paramount+ streamed an hour-long pre-show, The Tony Awards: Act One, which was hosted by Darren Criss and Julianne Hough and featured "special performances" and the presentation of selected awards. It was followed by the main ceremony telecast on CBS and Paramount+, which was hosted by Ariana DeBose. For the first time, the ceremony was televised live nationally.

Presenters

Act One:
 Vanessa Hudgens – presented Best Original Score
 Judith Light – presented Best Costume Design in a Play and Best Costume Design in a Musical
 Wilson Cruz – presented Best Scenic Design in a Play and Best Scenic Design in a Musical
 Jeremy Pope – presented Best Lighting Design in a Play and Best Lighting Design in a Musical
 Len Cariou – presented Special Tony Award to Angela Lansbury and introduced New York City Gay Men's Chorus
 George Takei – presented Best Sound Design of a Play and Best Sound Design of a Musical
 Gaten Matarazzo – presented Best Orchestrations
 Bebe Neuwirth – presented Best Choreography

Main Show:
 Jessica Chastain and Colman Domingo – presented Best Featured Actor in a Play
 Patrick Wilson – introduced The Music Man
 Kelli O'Hara and Ruthie Ann Miles – presented Best Featured Actress in a Musical
 Prince Jackson and Paris Jackson – introduced MJ the Musical
 Josh Lucas and Sarah Paulson – presented Best Direction of a Play and Best Direction of a Musical
 Sarah Silverman – introduced Mr. Saturday Night
 Skylar Astin and Marcia Gay Harden – presented Best Featured Actress in a Play
 Patina Miller – introduced Company
 Lilli Cooper and Julia Schick – special presentation on the Tonys' history
 LaTanya Richardson Jackson and Samuel L. Jackson – presented Best Revival of a Play
 Anthony Edwards – introduced Girl from the North Country
 Utkarsh Ambudkar and Raúl Esparza – presented Best Featured Actor in a Musical
 Lin-Manuel Miranda – presenter of the Stephen Sondheim tribute
 Darren Criss and Julianne Hough – presented Best Book of a Musical
 Renée Elise Goldsberry and Phillipa Soo – presented Best Revival of a Musical
 Jennifer Hudson and RuPaul Charles – introduced A Strange Loop
 Telly Leung – presented Excellence in Theatre Education Award
 Zach Braff and Lea Michele – introduced the original cast of Spring Awakening
 Andrew Garfield and Nathan Lane – presented Best Play
 David Alan Grier – introduced Paradise Square
 Tony Goldwyn and Bryan Cranston – presented Best Actor in a Play
 Tony Shalhoub and Danny Burstein – presented Best Actress in a Play
 Laurence Fishburne – presenter of the In Memoriam tribute
 Adrienne Warren and Aaron Tveit – presented Best Actor in a Musical
 Danielle Brooks and Cynthia Erivo – presented Best Actress in a Musical
 Bowen Yang – introduced Six
 Chita Rivera – presented Best Musical

Performances
The following shows and performers performed on the ceremony's telecast:

Act One:
 "Set the Stage" – Darren Criss and Julianne Hough
 "Mame" – New York City Gay Men's Chorus

Main Show:
 "This Is Your Round of Applause" – Ariana DeBose
 "Seventy-Six Trombones" – The Music Man
 "Smooth Criminal" – MJ
 "Stick Around" / "Buddy's First Act" – Mr. Saturday Night
 "Company" – Company
 "Like a Rolling Stone" / "Pressing On" – Girl from the North Country
 "Children Will Listen" – Bernadette Peters
 "Intermission Song" / "Today" – A Strange Loop
 "Touch Me" – The Original Cast of Spring Awakening
 "Paradise Square" / "Let It Burn" – Paradise Square
 "On the Street Where You Live" – Billy Porter
 "Ex-Wives" / "Six" – Six
 "This Is Your Round of Applause" (Reprise) – DeBose

Eligibility
The Tony Awards eligibility cut-off date for the 2021–22 season was May 4, 2022 for all Broadway productions which meet all other eligibility requirements. Nominations for the 2022 Tony Awards were announced by Adrienne Warren and Joshua Henry on May 9, 2022. They were initially going to be announced on May 3, but were extended a week to accommodate possible COVID-19 outbreaks. A revival of West Side Story that opened on February 20, 2020 was considered ineligible for the 74th Tony Awards because too few nominators and voters had seen it before Broadway shut down on March 12, 2020 due to the pandemic, and it did not resume when Broadway reopened in September 2021.

34 shows were eligible. All eligible shows are below.

Original plays
 Birthday Candles
 Chicken & Biscuits
 Clyde's
 Dana H.
 Hangmen
 Is This a Room
 Pass Over
 POTUS: Or, Behind Every Great Dumbass Are Seven Women Trying to Keep Him Alive
 Skeleton Crew
 The Lehman Trilogy
 The Minutes
 Thoughts of a Colored Man

Original musicals
 A Strange Loop
 Diana
 Flying Over Sunset
 Girl from the North Country
 MJ
 Mr. Saturday Night
 Mrs. Doubtfire
 Paradise Square
 Six

Play revivals
 American Buffalo
 for colored girls who have consideredsuicide / when the rainbow is enuf
 How I Learned to Drive
 Lackawanna Blues
 Macbeth
 Plaza Suite
 Take Me Out
 The Skin of Our Teeth
 Trouble in Mind

Musical revivals
 Caroline, or Change
 Company
 Funny Girl
 The Music Man

Winners and nominees 
Winners are listed first, and are highlighted in boldface:

‡ The award is presented to the producer(s) of the musical or play.

Nominations and awards per production

Non-competitive awards
Robert E. Wankel was awarded the Isabelle Stevenson Award for “his generosity and service to the welfare of our Broadway community, over the past four decades and, especially in the face of a global crisis." The award for Excellence in Theatre Education will also be brought back this year. The recipients of the Tony Honors for Excellence in Theatre include the Asian American Performers Action Coalition, Broadway for All, music copyist Emily Grishman, Feinstein's/54 Below, and United Scenic Artists (Local USA 829, IATSE). On May 23, 2022, it was announced that Angela Lansbury would be receiving a Special Tony Award for Lifetime Achievement. The Regional Tony Award was given to the Court Theatre. James C. Nicola, retiring artistic director of the New York Theatre Workshop after 34 years, also received a Special Tony Award.

Reception

Reviews
The ceremony received generally favorable reviews from critics. On the review aggregator Rotten Tomatoes, the program received six positive and two negative reviews, for an approval rating of 75%. 

In Variety, Gordon Cox praised the opening number of the CBS telecast and DeBose's performance as host therein, singling out the performance as "hip and queer and sexy, and it satisfied the old-school avids as much as it made Broadway look like a place the cool kids might want to check out, too". Jennifer Vanasco of NPR also praised DeBose, writing "Let Ariana DeBose host everything [...] She was funny and playful, strutting into the audience and sitting on Andrew Garfield's lap. She was poignant, coming to tears as she talked about her theater teacher mentor. She was honest, gently commenting on the racial disparities in the theater industry". Writing for the Associated Press, Jocelyn Noveck called the telecast "exuberant" and said that it showed "Broadway is back, with verve and creativity, and it is here to stay. It just needs even more people filling the seats".

Johnny Oleksinski of the New York Post panned the show, describing it as "low-energy, poorly put-on", writing that DeBose's "songs and banter were forced and unfunny", and heavily criticizing the ceremony's tribute to Stephen Sondheim, which he deemed "far too modest [...] a total afterthought".

Ratings
The CBS telecast was watched by 3.86 million viewers in the United States, marking a 39% increase from the previous year's ceremony, the lowest-rated Tony Awards broadcast since viewership was measured. However, when compared to the 73rd Tony Awards in 2019, which were the last one before the 75th to run three hours and the last one before the COVID-19 pandemic, viewership declined 29% between 2019 and 2022.

See also
 Drama Desk Awards
 2022 Laurence Olivier Awards – equivalent awards for West End theatre productions
 Obie Award
 New York Drama Critics' Circle
 Theatre World Award
 Lucille Lortel Awards

References

External links

 

2020s in Manhattan
2022 awards in the United States
2022 in New York City
Tony Awards ceremonies
June 2022 events in the United States
Television shows directed by Glenn Weiss